Bononcini is a surname. Notable people with the surname include:

Antonio Maria Bononcini (1677–1726), Italian cellist and composer
Giovanni Bononcini (1670–1747), Italian Baroque composer, cellist, singer, and teacher
Giovanni Maria Bononcini (1642–1678), Italian violinist and composer, father of both of the above.